Real Friends is the third studio album by R&B group The Friends of Distinction, released in 1969 on the RCA Victor label.

Chart performance
The album peaked at No. 9 on the R&B albums chart. It also reached No. 68 on the Billboard 200. The album features the single "Love or Let Me Be Lonely", which peaked at No. 6 on the Billboard Hot 100 and No. 13 on the Hot Soul Singles chart.

Track listing

Personnel
Jessica Cleaves, Charlene Gibson, Harry Elston, Floyd Butler – vocals

Charts

Singles

References

External links 
 

1970 albums
The Friends of Distinction albums
RCA Records albums